T-411 may refer to:

Khrunichev T-411 Aist, a Russian aircraft design
Washington T-411 Wolverine, an American homebuilt aircraft design